Ahmed Kamāl (July 29, 1849 – August 5, 1923, also known as Ahmed Kamal Bey (Pasha)) was Egypt’s first Egyptologist and pioneer in his own country. Kamal was of Turkish origin.

Research 

He trained under the German Egyptologist Heinrich Brugsch.

He was a curator at the Egyptian Museum in Cairo and a staff member of the Supreme Council of Antiquities. He was jointly responsible for the Egyptian collections’ classification and significantly involved in the museum's removal from both Boulaq to Giza and Giza to the Tahrir Square at Cairo's city center.

He took part in several excavations at Dayr al-Barsha, Gabal at-Tayr, Tihna el-Gebel, Gamhud, Atfih, Mayr, El-Sheikh Sa'id, Asyut, Dara, Amarna as well as in the Nile Valley. In Dara, he discovered the only known attestation of pharaoh Khui.

Important publications 

 Kamal, Ahmed, Stèles ptolémaiques et romaines, two volumes, Le Caire, 1904–1905, (Catalogue général des antiquités égyptiennes du Musée du Caire).
 Kamal, Ahmed, Tables d'offrandes, two volumes, Le Caire, 1906, 1909, (Catalogue général des antiquités égyptiennes du Musée du Caire).

References

 Abou-Ghazi, Dia', Ahmed Kamal. 1849–1923, Annales du Service des Antiquités de l'Égypte, volume 64 (1981), pp. 1 – 5, portrait plate.
 Dawson, Warren R. ; Uphill, Eric P. ; Bierbrier, M. L., Who was who in Egyptology, London : The Egypt Exploration Society, 1995 (3rd edition), p. 224.

1849 births
1923 deaths
Egyptian people of Turkish descent
Egyptian Egyptologists